Multishow ao Vivo: Ivete no Maracanã is Ivete Sangalo's second live album (ninth overall). The album has sold over 2 million copies in Brazil (being certified Diamond), and features the single "Deixo". It was recorded live on a crowded Maracanã Stadium for the cable TV channel Multishow. It was nominated for three Latin Grammy Awards.

The album had 5 singles:
"Berimbal Metalizado"- the first single from the live album, the song as a smash hit in south  america.
Deixo - the song was a hit in Brazil and in Portugal.
Não Precisa Mudar - a duet with Saulo Fernandes, was a smash hit in Brazil.
Ilumina - the third single and was a moderate success.
Corazón Partío - the fifth and final single. It is a duet with the Spanish singer Alejandro Sanz and was available only for airplay.

Track listing
 "Never Gonna Give You Up" (Instrumental) / "Abalou"
 "Não Quero Dinheiro (Só Quero Amar)"
 "Berimbau Metalizado"
 "Corazón Partío" (featuring Alejandro Sanz)
 "Ilumina"
 "Não Me Conte Seus Problemas"
 "Não Precisa Mudar" (featuring Saulo Fernandes)
 "A Galera"
 "Dengo de Amor"
 "Citação: é Difícil" / "Chorando Se Foi"
 "Bota pra Ferver" (featuring Durval Lelys)
 "Quando a Chuva Passar"
 "Deixo"
 "Não Vou Ficar" (featuring Samuel Rosa)
 "Nosso Sonho" / "Conquista" / "Poder" (featuring MC Buchecha)
 "País Tropical" / "Arerê" / "Taj Mahal"
 "Completo" (Bonus track)

Latin Grammy nominations
 Best Brazilian Contemporary Pop Album
 Best Brazilian Song - "Berimbau Metalizado" - Miro Almeida, Dória & Duller (songwriters)
 Best Long Form Music Video - Joana Mazzucchelli (director), Wilson Cunha (producer)

Charts

Year-end charts

Certifications

References

Ivete Sangalo albums
2007 live albums
Portuguese-language live albums